Eat Already? 4 is a Singaporean Cantonese- and Hokkien-language drama series which is telecast on Singapore's free-to-air channel, Mediacorp Channel 8. It stars Chen Shucheng, Hong Huifang, Elvin Ng, Rebecca Lim, Sheila Sim, Dennis Chew, Zhu Houren, Richard Low and Zen Chong as the casts of the fourth installment with special appearance Grace Fu.

This would be the fourth dialect drama to be produced on Channel 8 after a 30-year hiatus.
	
This series is primarily targeted at Singaporean elderly as most of them speak Chinese dialects at home. This is the series finale to the Eat Already? series.

Casts

Yuan's Family

Ah Niu Sao's Family

Zhu Hanjie's Family

Ah Soon's Family

Other Cast

Cameo Appearance

Awards & Nominations

Star Awards 2019

Trivia
Marcus Chin is the only cast member to have appeared in all four Eat Already? series.

References

2018 Singaporean television seasons